Arudra (born Bhagavatula Sadasiva Sankara Sastry; 31 August 1925 – 4 June 1998) was an Indian author, poet, lyricist, translator, publisher, dramatist, playwright, and an expert on Telugu literature. He is also known for his works in Telugu cinema as a lyricist, dialogue writer, and story writer. He received the Sahitya Akademi Award in 1987.

Early life
Aarudra was born in Yelamanchili, Anakapalli district, Andhra Pradesh, India on 31 August 1925. Aarudra is the nephew of Telugu poet Sri Sri. After primary education, he shifted to Vizianagaram in 1942 for his college education. He was attracted to communism after coming into contact with people like Ronanki Appalaswami and Chaganti Somayajulu.

He joined the Indian Air Force as a Band Boy in 1943 and served it till 1947. He shifted to Madras and worked as editor of Anandavani magazine for two years. Joining the film industry in 1949, he wrote lyrics and dialogues for many films. He married noted writer K. Rama Lakshmi (a columnist and a writer-critic in her own right) in 1954.

Literary works
Tvamevaham (You are none other than me) and Samagra Andhra Sahityam (An Encyclopedia of Telugu Literature) are his landmark works. He wrote poetry such as Koonalamma Padaalu, reminiscences of the Second World War. He translated the Tamil treatise Tirukkural into Telugu. He belonged to the school of progressive writers such as Abhyudaya Rachayitala Sangham.

Tvamevaham
Tvamevaaham written in 1948 was based on the contemporary violence and lawlessness during the Razakar movement in the princely state of Hyderabad. The Razakar attrocoties were sponsored by the Nizam against his own people who wanted to overthrow him in favor of democracy and join the Indian Union. In this kaavyam, death spoke to a human being and says, "you and I are the same (Tvamevaaham)".

The Samagra Andhra Sahityam
AHumpy first published the SAS in 12 parts between 1965 and 1968.  It spans the Telugu literature from the 9th century CE to modern times. He chronicled the history of Telugu Literature in 12 volumes:
 Early and Chalukya Era (From 8 – 9c CE to end of 12c CE)
 Kakatiya dynasty (1200–1290 CE)
 Padmanayaka Era (1337–1399 CE)
 Reddiraju Era (1400–1450 CE)
 Early Rayala (Vijayanagara) (1450–1500 CE)
 Later Rayala (Vijayanagara) (1500–1550 CE)
 Nawabs (1550–1600 CE)
 Nayaka Kings (1600–1670 CE)
 Later Nayaka Kings (1670–1750 CE)
 East India Company (1750–1850 CE)
 Zamindari (1850–1900 CE)
 Modern (1900 CE onwards)

How is Sita related to Rama?
Ramudiki Sita Yemautundi? or How is Sita related to Rama?, put before the public the riddle of Mandodari, Sita and Hanuman and their origins in a lucid and scholarly way. It was a bold attempt at cracking the Valmiki-Ramayana code and in the process de-mystified the story of Rama to the middle-class, literate, modern day Telugu reader.

The book explores the Buddhist and Jain sources of the story of Rama. It also surveys the Khotan Siam (Thai), Laos, and Malaysian versions of the story of Rama. Here is a sampling from the  'Dasaratha Jataka ', a Buddhist Tale:
Buddha narrates the 'Dasaratha Jataka' tale to a householder who was grieving the death of his son....Long long ago.. Dasaratha was the king of Varanasi. He had sixteen thousand wives.The Queen had two sons and a daughter.The eldest son was called Ramapundit and the younger one was called Laxmanpundit. The daughter was called Sitadevi. The Queen dies after sometime. Dasaratha marries again, and comes to like her the most. She begets a son named Bharata...When Ramapundit returns from the forest, he marries Sita and rules for 16000 years...Bodhisatta concludes the story stating that Dasaratha was none other than Shuddhodana (Father of Buddha) in an earlier reincarnation. Similarly, Sita was none other than Rahulmata (Mother of Rahul or Wife of Buddha) and Ramapundit was none other than Buddha himself.Aarudra's questions like "How is Sita related to Rama?" or "Were they just Husband and wife?" may sound naive or sacrilegious but a serious study of genealogies, as revealed from different sources, logically leads to them. To deny the existence of such stories, per Arudra, would amounted to intellectual dishonesty.

List of his works
Poems (Kavyas): Tvamevaaham, Sinivaali, koonalamma Padaalu, Intinti Pajyaalu. America Intinti pajyaalu, sitakoka chilukalu (radio play)
Lyrics: Gaayaalu-Geyaalu, Pailaapacceesu, Yencina Padyaalu, Yetikedadi, Kondagaali Tirigindi.
Translations: Veera Telangaana Viplava Geetalu (from English), Vennela-Vesavi (from Tamil), Kabeer Bhaavaalu and Batvaada-Arudra (from Hindi).
Dramas: Udgeedha, Geyanaatika, Raadaari Bangla, Saalabhanjikalu.
Dual Poetry: Rukkuteswara Satakam (with Sri Sri), Meemee (with Sri Sri and Varada)
Research Work: Samagraandhra Saahityam, Arudra Vyaasapeetham, Raamudi ki Seeta Yemavutundi?,
Other works: Arudra kathalu, Mahaneeyulu, Chadarangam, cinema scripts and lyrics.

Filmography

 Beedala Patlu (1950) (lyrics)
 Kanna Talli (1953) (writer)
 Pakka Inti Ammayi (1953) (adapted screenplay)
 Veera Kankanam (1957) (dialogue)
 Chenchu Lakshmi (1958) (lyrics)
 Illarikam (1959) (dialogue)
 Jayabheri (1959) (lyrics)
 Aradhana (1962) (lyrics)
 Bhishma (1962) (lyrics)
 Dakshayagnam (1962) (writer)
 Manchi Kutumbam (1965) (lyrics)
 Gudachari 116 (1966) (story and dialogue)
 Farz (1967) (story)
 The Train (1970) (screenplay)
 Mosagallaku Mosagadu (1971) (story and dialogues)
 Andala Ramudu (1973) (lyrics)
 Muthyala Muggu (1975) (lyrics)
 Yashoda Krishna (1975) (writer)
 Mahakavi Kshetrayya (1976) (writer)
 Daana Veera Soora Karna (1977) (lyrics)
 Mallepoovu (1977) (lyrics)
 Anugraham (1978) (dialogue)
 Kondura (The Sage from the Sea) (1978) (writer)
 Thoorpu Velle Railu (1979) (lyrics)
 Pelli Pusthakam (1991) (lyrics)
 Mr. Pellam (1993) (lyrics)

Film songs
His film songs are compiled and published by his wife K. Ramalaxmi in five volumes.

References

Indian lyricists
Telugu-language lyricists
Telugu people
Telugu poets
1925 births
1998 deaths
Telugu-language writers
Andhra University alumni
20th-century Indian dramatists and playwrights
Indian male dramatists and playwrights
Telugu-language dramatists and playwrights
Recipients of the Sahitya Akademi Award in Telugu
20th-century Indian poets
20th-century Indian historians
Writers from Visakhapatnam
Dramatists and playwrights from Andhra Pradesh
Indian Marxist writers
Indian atheists